Czechoslovakia 1968 (also known as Czechoslovakia 1918-1968)  is a 1969 short documentary film about the "Prague Spring", the Russian invasion of Czechoslovakia. The film was produced by the United States Information Agency (USIA) under the direction of Robert M. Fresco and Denis Sanders and features the graphic design of Norman Gollin.

It won the Academy Award for Best Documentary Short Subject and in 1997, was selected for preservation in the United States National Film Registry by the Library of Congress having been identified as "culturally, historically, or aesthetically significant".

Controversy
In 1972, Senator James L. Buckley obtained a copy of Czechoslovakia 1968 to show on New York television stations. The chairman of the Senate Foreign Relations Committee, J. William Fulbright, objected to the broadcast based on an interpretation of the Smith–Mundt Act, which would prohibit the domestic dissemination of material produced by the USIA. Fulbright complained to the Attorney General, but the Justice Department refused to intervene based on the interpretation of existing US law. In 1972, Congress amended the Smith-Mundt Act, based on this event, to explicitly prohibit the domestic dissemination of materials produced by the USIA. The USIA was abolished in 1999.

Accolades
1970 - Academy Award for Best Documentary Short Subject

See also
 List of American films of 1969
 Robert M. Fresco
 Denis Sanders

References

External links
"Czechoslovakia 1968" essay by Robert M. Fresco at National Film Registry
"Czechoslovakia 1968" essay by Daniel Eagan in America's Film Legacy: The Authoritative Guide to the Landmark Movies in the National Film Registry, A&C Black, 2010 , pages 656-657
Czechoslovakia 1968 at the National Archives and Records Administration

 The film in its entirety on YouTube
 Czechoslovakia 1918–1968 on MUBI

1969 films
1969 documentary films
1969 short films
1960s short documentary films
American anti-communist propaganda shorts
American short documentary films
Best Documentary Short Subject Academy Award winners
Czechoslovakia–United States relations
Documentary films about the Cold War
Films directed by Denis Sanders
Films scored by Charles Bernstein
Films set in 1968
Films set in the Czech Republic
Films set in Slovakia
Prague Spring
United States Information Agency films
United States National Film Registry films
Collage film
1960s English-language films
1960s American films